Chañarcillo is a town and mine in the Atacama Desert of Copiapó Province,  Atacama Region, Chile, located near Vallenar and 60 km from Copiapó. It is noted for its silver mining. The town grew up after the Chañarcillo silver mine was discovered on May 16, 1832, by Juan Godoy. This event sparkled the Chilean silver rush. It grew in prominence in the second half of the nineteenth century and became important in the Atacama mining industry and one of the most important mines to the Chilean economy. It was connected by railway before 1862. Today the settlement is largely in ruins.

The Chanarcillo District produced at least $100 million in silver before abandonment.  This production from up to 20 mines was limited to a third of a square mile.  From 1860 until 1885, 2,500,000 kg of silver was produced.  Most production occurred before 1930 and since then until 1960, only minor amounts of silver was produced by removing pillars in mines or from the dump material.

In 1870, 1570 miners worked in the Chañarcillo mines; however the mines were exhausted by 1874 and mining largely ended in 1888 after the mines were accidentally flooded. Despite this, Chañarcillo was the most productive mining district in 19th century Chile.

Geology
Chanarcillo is on the south flank of a dome, the Sierra de Chanarcillo, characterized by radial fractures and northwest striking faults.  Silver ore occurs in nearly vertical veins within these fractures and faults within interbedded limestones and tuffs.  This ore zone is an oxidized  and supergene_(geology) sulfide enriched rock.  Oxidized ores occur above the water table and supergene sulfide enrichment below.

In the oxidized zone, ore minerals include native silver and argentite have been replaced by cerargyrite, iodobromite, bromyrite, embolite, iodyrite. In the supergene sulfide enriched zone, ore minerals include pearceite, proustite, tetrahedrite, polybasite, and pyrargyrite. 

Magnificent groups of large crystals have been found at Chañarcillo, including proustite, stephanite, chlorargyrite and adamite.

See also
Agua Amarga
Arqueros
Tres Puntas
Mining in Chile

References

Bibliography

Silver mines in Chile
Populated places in Copiapó Province
Mines in Atacama Region
Underground mines in Chile
Former mines in Chile